Dalhousie Athletic Club is an Indian multi-sports club based in Kolkata, West Bengal. It was established in 1880, during the British rule in India. The club tent is located in Mayo Road, Kolkata Maidan, in Esplanade. Dalhousie competed in the Premier Division of Calcutta Football League for a long time.

History

Formation and early history
Dalhousie AC was founded as the Trades Club in 1878, and is the second oldest football club established in the country. The athletic division was incorporated by the British employees of jute mills and members of then established organizations such as the Naval Volunteers, Police, Customs and the Armenian Club. Trades Club was renamed as Dalhousie Club after the famous Dalhousie Institute, which was situated on the south side of Dalhousie Square and was originally constructed as a Monumental Hall. The club later won prestigious Calcutta Football League four times in 1910, 1921, 1928 and 1929. With having British officials in club committee, Dalhousie instituted and organized Trades Cup (the second oldest football tournament in the country) in 1889, with the help of trading community of Calcutta. It was the first open football tournament in India, where Indian, British, regimental and college clubs participated, and the club clinched the trophy in inaugural edition defeating Howrah AC 2–1. Dalhousie later achieved the prestigious IFA Shield title in 1897, and 1905. In 1905, the club reached Gladstone Cup final, held in Chinsurah, but lost 6–1 to Mohun Bagan.

Present years
In 2014, they participated in the 14th Darjeeling Gold Cup in Siliguri and reached the final, but finished as runner-up after losing 5–0 to then I-League side ONGC.

Dalhousie participated in Calcutta Premier Division B in 2014–15, and participated in tournaments like Amta Sanghati Gold Cup. They were relegated to first division in 2015–16. Playing in the lower divisions for a couple of years, the club in June 2022, launched their new home and away jerseys at a seasonal ceremony in club tent. At the program, Dalhousie became affiliated to Mohun Bagan with aim of qualifying for the premier division, in which then AIFF senior vice-president Subrata Dutta, IFA secretary Anirban Dutta, and Mohun Bagan secretary Debasish Dutta attended.

Other department(s)

Men's cricket
Dalhousie AC has its cricket section, which is affiliated with the Cricket Association of Bengal (CAB). It uses the Kolkata Maidan fields for home games. The club predominantly participates in the CAB conducted tournaments such as the First Division League, JC Mukherjee T-20 Trophy, A. N. Ghosh Memorial Trophy, CAB One Day League and P. Sen Trophy.

Men's hockey
The men's field hockey section of Dalhousie formed during the British rule in India and the team was formerly consisting of Anglo-Indian players. The club is affiliated with Bengal Hockey Association (BHA), and participate in lower division of Calcutta Hockey League under the name of "Dalhousie Institute".

Honours

League
 Calcutta Football League
Champions (4): 1910, 1921, 1928, 1929

Cup
IFA Shield
Champions (2): 1897, 1905
Runners-up (5): 1900, 1902, 1922, 1927, 1928

Trades Cup
Champions (2): 1889, 2019
Runners-up (1): 1907

Gladstone Cup
Runners-up (1): 1905
Darjeeling Gold Cup
Runners-up (1): 2014

See also
Football in Kolkata
History of Indian football
Football clubs in Kolkata

Notes

References

Further reading

Dutta, P. L., Memoir of 'Father of Indian Football' Nagendraprasad Sarbadhikary (Calcutta: N. P. Sarbadhikary Memorial Committee, 1944) (hereafter Memoir)

Ghosh, Saurindra Kumar. Krira Samrat Nagendraprasad Sarbadhikary 1869–1940 (Calcutta: N. P. Sarbadhikary Memorial Committee, 1963) (hereafter Krira Samrat).
Roselli, John. Self Image of Effeteness: Physical Education and Nationalism in Nineteenth Century Bengal. Past & Present (journal). 86 (February 1980). p. 121–48.

Sinha, Mrinalini. Colonial Masculinity, The Manly Englishman and the Effeminate Bengali in the Late Nineteenth Century (Manchester: Manchester University Press, 1995).
Chatterjee, Partha. The Nation and Its Fragments: Colonial and Post-colonial Histories (Calcutta: Oxford University Press, 1995).
Mason, Football on the Maidan, p. 144; Dimeo, Football and Politics in Bengal, p. 62.

From recreation to competition: Early history of Indian football . pp. 124–141. Published online: 6 Aug 2006. www.tandfonline.com. Retrieved 30 June 2021.

External links

 Dalhousie AC team profile and logo at Football Manager (archived 16 February 2023)

Multi-sport clubs in India
Football clubs in Kolkata
1878 establishments in India
Sports clubs in India
Sports clubs established in 1878
Association football clubs established in 1878